The 2013 South Africa Sevens was the third tournament within the 2013–2014 Sevens World Series. It was held over the weekend of 7–8 December 2013 at Nelson Mandela Bay Stadium in Port Elizabeth, with South Africa emerging the winners.

Format
The teams were drawn into four pools of four teams each. Each team played everyone in their pool one time. The top two teams from each pool advanced to the Cup/Plate brackets. The bottom two teams from each group went to the Bowl/Shield brackets.

Teams
The participating teams and schedule were announced on 30 November 2013.

Pool stage

Pool A

Pool B

Pool C

Pool D

Knockout stage

Shield

Bowl

Plate

Cup

References

External links

South Africa Sevens
South Africa Sevens
2013 in South African rugby union